Oak Grove, also known as Richardson Place, is a historic home located near Brunson, Hampton County, South Carolina. It was built in 1852, and is a two-story, Greek Revival style clapboard dwelling on a raised basement. The front facade features a two-story verandah. It is believed that General William Tecumseh Sherman visited Oak Grove during the American Civil War, while on his rampage through the Carolinas during his Campaign of the Carolinas.

It was listed on the National Register of Historic Places in 1976.

References

Houses on the National Register of Historic Places in South Carolina
Greek Revival houses in South Carolina
Houses completed in 1852
National Register of Historic Places in Hampton County, South Carolina
Houses in Hampton County, South Carolina
1852 establishments in South Carolina